Andres Anvelt (born on 30 September 1969 Tallinn) is an Estonian politician and writer. He belongs to Social Democratic Party.

2003-2006 he was director of Estonian Academy of Security Sciences Police College.

2011-2015 he was member of XII Riigikogu. And thereafter member of XIII Riigikogu.

2014–2015 he was judicial minister of Estonia.

He is the grandson of communist revolutionary Jaan Anvelt.

References

External links
 Andres Anvelt at Estonian Writers' Online Dictionary

1969 births
Living people
Politicians from Tallinn
Writers from Tallinn
Social Democratic Party (Estonia) politicians
Members of the Riigikogu, 2011–2015
University of Tartu alumni
Tallinn University of Technology alumni
Members of the Riigikogu, 2015–2019
21st-century Estonian writers